Wallstawe is a municipality in the district Altmarkkreis Salzwedel, in Saxony-Anhalt, Germany. Since July 2009 it has included the former municipalities of Ellenberg and Gieseritz.

References

Altmarkkreis Salzwedel